Rickey D'Shon Collins (born January 17, 1983) is an American actor, most notable for providing the voice of Vince LaSalle in Disney's Recess. He also voiced Tucker Foley in the Nickelodeon show Danny Phantom.

Career
He has done voice overs for other television shows such as Static Shock and Justice League. He also voiced Vince LaSalle in the Recess film Recess: School's Out. In 2006, he reprised his role as Vince LaSalle once again, in a special crossover episode of Lilo & Stitch: The Series. He is best known as the associate producer in the 2009 comedy short Brotherlee and the writer in the 2011 thriller short Undiagnosed. He voiced a penguin in Happy Feet.

Collins has made guest appearances on live action television series, including as Eric Burton in Star Trek: The Next Generation, Blossom, Grace Under Fire, In the House, Roc, The Practice, and Without a Trace.

Filmography

Film
Father & Son: Dangerous Relations (1993) - Project Boy
Once Upon a Forest (1993) - Bosworth (voice)
Little Giants (1994) - Briggs
Jack (1996) - Eric
Warriors of Virtue (1997) - Chucky
Recess: School's Out (2001) - Vince LaSalle (voice)
Recess Christmas: Miracle on Third Street (2001) - Vince LaSalle (voice)
Recess: All Growed Down (2003) - Vince LaSalle (voice)
Recess: Taking the Fifth Grade (2003) - Vince LaSalle (voices)
The Golden Blaze (2005) - Leon (voice)
Happy Feet (2006) - Male Penguin
Little Brown Baby (2017) - Marcus

Television
Home Improvement (1991) - Club Scout #1
Roc (1991) - Davey
Parker Lewis Can't Lose (1992) - Kevin
Blossom (1993) - Devon
Empty Nest (1993) - Les
The Sinbad Show (1993) - Kid #1
Star Trek: The Next Generation (1993–1994) - Eric
The Pink Panther (1993) - Additional voices
Grace Under Fire (1995) - Charles Briscoe
In Your House (1995–1996) - Scott, Tyler
High Incident (1996) - Boy #4
Happily Ever After: Fairy Tales for Every Child (1997) - School Child #2 (voices)
Baywatch (1997) - Derrick
Brooklyn South (1997) - Darnell Withers
Recess (1997–2001) - Vince LaSalle (voice)
Katie Joplin (1999) - Boy #1
Static Shock (2000–2002) - Boom, Byron, Boy (voices)
The District (2001) - Al Jr.
The Practice (2001) - Steven Miller
Justice League (2002) - Charles McGee, Robber (voices)
Without a Trace (2004) - Terrell Brooks
Danny Phantom (2004–2007) - Tucker Foley, Police Man, Cop #1 (voices)
Lilo & Stitch: The Series (2006) - Vince LaSalle (voice)
The Fairly Odd Phantom (2017) - Tucker Foley (voice)
Jungledyret Hugo (2021) - Zik

Video games
Def Jam Fight for NY (2004) - Rome
Danny Phantom: The Ultimate Enemy (2005) - Tucker Foley
Nicktoons: Battle for Volcano Island (2006) - Tucker Foley
SpongeBob SquarePants featuring Nicktoons: Globs of Doom (2008) - Tucker Foley

References

External links

1983 births
Living people
African-American male actors
American male film actors
American male television actors
American male video game actors
American male voice actors
Male actors from San Diego
21st-century African-American people
20th-century African-American people